Itagano is an administrative ward in the Mbeya Urban district of the Mbeya Region of Tanzania. In 2016 the Tanzania National Bureau of Statistics report there were 1,930 people in the ward, from 1,751 in 2012.

Neighborhoods 
The ward has 2 neighborhoods Ipombo, and Itagano.

References 

Wards of Mbeya Region